William Wirt Hastings (December 31, 1866 – April 8, 1938) was an American politician and a U.S. Representative from Oklahoma.

Biography
Born on a farm in Benton County, Arkansas, near the Indian Territory boundary, Hastings was the son of William Archibald "Yell" and Louisa J. Stover Hastings, and moved with his parents to a farm at Beatties Prairie, Delaware County (then part of the Cherokee Nation in Indian Territory), Oklahoma, and attended the Cherokee tribal school. He graduated from Cherokee Male Seminary, at Tahlequah, in 1884. He was married to Lula Mayfield Starr on December 9, 1896, and they had four children, Grace, Lucile, Mayme, and Lillian.

Career
Hastings was a teacher in the Cherokee tribal schools from 1884 to 1886. He graduated from the law department of Vanderbilt University, Nashville, Tennessee, in 1889. Admitted to the bar in the same year he began his practice in Tahlequah, Oklahoma. He was again a teacher in the tribal schools from 1889 to 1891. He served as Attorney general for the Cherokee Nation from 1891 to 1895, and as National attorney for the Cherokee tribe from 1907 to 1914. He served as delegate to the Democratic State convention in 1912, as well as delegate to the Democratic National Convention in 1912.

Elected as a Democrat to the Sixty-fourth, Sixty-fifth, and Sixty-sixth Congresses, Hastings served from March 4, 1915, to March 3, 1921. 
During that time, he served as chairman of the Committee on Expenditures in the Department of the Interior (Sixty-fifth Congress). He was an unsuccessful candidate for reelection in 1920 to the Sixty-seventh Congress, losing to Republican Alice Mary Robertson. This was the first time in history that an incumbent U.S. Congressman was defeated by a female candidate.

Hastings was elected to the Sixty-eighth and to the five succeeding Congresses and served from March 4, 1923, to January 3, 1935. Not a candidate for renomination in 1934, he resumed practicing law in Tahlequah, Oklahoma.

Through his efforts, Tahlequah had received an Indian hospital as a Christmas present in 1935. Hastings returned to public life briefly when he was appointed by President Franklin D. Roosevelt as a Cherokee Chief for one day to sign a new deed when an error was found in the old abstract.

Death
Hastings died on April 8, 1938 (age 71 years, 98 days), in Muskogee, Oklahoma. He is interred in City Cemetery, Tahlequah, Oklahoma.

See also
 List of Native Americans in the United States Congress

References

External links 
 
 Encyclopedia of Oklahoma History and Culture – Hastings, William
 

|-

|-

1866 births
1938 deaths
20th-century American politicians
20th-century Native Americans
Democratic Party members of the United States House of Representatives from Oklahoma
Cherokee Nation members of the United States House of Representatives
Native American members of the United States Congress
People from Benton County, Arkansas
People of Indian Territory